Asghar Ali Shah Stadium is a cricket ground in Karachi, Pakistan. It was constructed in the memory of Late. Justice Asghar Ali Shah, former Judge in Sindh High Court, father of a renowned orthopaedic surgeon, a politician and a member of Pakistan Cricket Board Dr. Syed Mohammad Ali Shah. Dr. Shah was also the manager of this stadium.

Ground history 
The stadium was constructed in 1993 in order to facilitate the club cricket in Karachi. It was the second cricket stadium in Pakistan (first being Gaddafi Stadium) to have the facility of flood lights to conduct the game at night.

Usage 
The stadium has been used for many international matches of smaller levels such as Under 17 Asia Cricket Cup, Under 19 Cricket Tournaments and also women's cricket tournaments have been held here. Mostly, this stadium hosts first class and domestic cricket matches. Dr.M.A.Shah Night Twenty20 Trophy is also held here every year in the month of Ramadan in which cricket teams representing cricket clubs from around the country play each other.

See also
 List of stadiums in Pakistan
 List of cricket grounds in Pakistan
 List of sports venues in Karachi
 List of sports venues in Lahore
 List of sports venues in Faisalabad
Karachi
Dr. Muhammad Ali Shah
Cricket

References

External links
Asghar Ali Shah Stadium, profile on Cricinfo
 Asghar Ali Shah Stadium, profile on CricketArchive

Cricket grounds in Pakistan
Cricket
Stadiums in Pakistan
Stadiums in Karachi
Cricket in Karachi